Eliseo Herrero was a Spanish-born Argentine actor. He starred in the 1950 film Arroz con leche under director Carlos Schlieper.

Selected filmography
 The Song of the Suburbs (1941)
 Arroz con leche (1950)
 The Earring (1951)

References

External links
 
 

Argentine male film actors
Male actors from Madrid